Line 9 (Emerald), formerly Line C (Sky Blue) and Line C (Emerald), is one of the three lines operated by ViaMobilidade and one of the thirteen lines that make up the São Paulo Metro Rail Transport Network, in Brazil. Since 27 January 2022, ViaMobilidade operates the line for 30 years, along with Line 8-Diamond.

Characteristics

Stations

See also 
 Santos-Jundiaí Railroad
 Line 10 (CPTM)

References

External links

 Official page of the CPTM
 Secretaria dos Transportes Metropolitanos

Companhia Paulista de Trens Metropolitanos
CPTM 09